Charles Huff may refer to:

 Brad Huff, also known as Charles Bradley Huff (born 1979), an American cyclist
 Charles Huff (American football) (born 1983), an American football coach